Makol Cuei is a  boma in  Baidit payam, Bor West County, Jonglei State, South Sudan, about 30 kilometers north of Bor.  The village is located at the southern extent of the sudd, South Sudan's vast central wetlands.

Demographics
According to the Fifth Population and Housing Census of Sudan, conducted in April 2008, Makol Cuei  boma had a population of 10,065 people, composed of 5,615 male and 4,450 female residents.

Culture and community
In March, 2012, a large church, school and health clinic were opened in Makol Cuei, with support from a businessman who had grown up there.  The church is the seat of Jonglei State's Athoc diocese.

Notes

References 

Populated places in Jonglei State